Street Food Fighter is a South Korean food travel reality show broadcast on tvN.

The show follows chef host Baek Jong-won introducing and trying local street foods around the world.

Season 1 was aired on Mondays on tvN at 11 p.m. (KST) from 23 April 2018 to 11 June 2018.

Season 2 was aired on Sundays on tvN at 10.40 p.m. (KST) from 22 September 2019 to 24 November 2019.

Episodes and ratings 
In the ratings below, the highest rating for the show will be in red, and the lowest rating for the show will be in blue each year.

Season 1

Season 2 

 Note that the show airs on a cable channel (pay TV), which plays part in its slower uptake and relatively small audience share when compared to programs broadcast (FTA) on public networks such as KBS, SBS, MBC or EBS.
 NR rating means "not reported".
 TNmS have stopped publishing their rating report from June 2018.

References

External links 
  
  

South Korean travel television series
South Korean variety television shows
Korean-language television shows
TVN (South Korean TV channel) original programming